SnapEditor is an HTML5 WYSIWYG text editor from 8098182 Canada Inc. that can be used in web pages. It was born out of frustration with existing editors and aims to solve those frustrations. The first version was released in 2012. Its development was stopped as of Sept 23, 2013.

Its core code is written in JavaScript and can integrate with any server side language such as PHP, ASP.NET, ColdFusion, Java, Perl, Python, Ruby.

SnapEditor is compatible with most Internet browsers, including: Internet Explorer 7.0+ (Windows), Firefox 2.0+, Safari 3.0+, and Google Chrome (windows).

Frustrations
The frustrations that SnapEditor is aiming to solve are
 WYSIAWYG (what you see is almost what you get)
 unexpected behaviour
 messy HTML

In-place and form-based editors
SnapEditor provides both an in-place editor for situations where true WYSIWYG is needed, but still provides a form-based editor in case forms are still used.

References

External links
 SnapEditor website
 SnapEditor License Agreement
 SnapEditor Documentation
 SnapEditor Download

JavaScript-based HTML editors